Kopsiopsis strobilacea, the California groundcone, is a species of parasitic plant in the family Orobanchaceae. It is native to California and southern Oregon, where it grows in wooded areas and chaparral. It is a parasite of manzanitas and madrones, which it parasitizes by penetrating them with haustoria to tap nutrients. Pale-margined purple flowers emerge from between the overlapping bracts.

Formerly considered Boschniakia strobilacea, some taxonomists now place it in the genus Kopsiopsis on the basis of phylogenetic evidence.

References

Orobanchaceae
Flora of California
Flora of Oregon
Flora without expected TNC conservation status